Ammitakum II was the last king of the ancient Mesopotamian city Alalakh. Archaeologists unearthed a large number of tablets detailing Ammitakum's reign. These documents showed that many citizens of Alalakh were indebted to him. Ammitakum purchased two settlements named Age and Igandan from Irkabtum, a king of Yamhad. It is likely Ammitakum was succeeded by Hammurabi of Alalakh. Ammitakum also arranged an arranged marriage for his son. He married his son to the daughter of the king of Ibla.

References 

Ancient Mesopotamia
Near East
Ancient Mesopotamian people
Sumerian kings
Kings of Alalakh